Big Sandy Subdivision may refer to:
Big Sandy Subdivision (BNSF Railway) in Montana
Big Sandy Subdivision (CSX Transportation) in Kentucky